Formation is the personal preparation that the Catholic Church offers to people with a defined mission, such as the priesthood or membership of a  religious order such as the  Society of Jesus. Such formation involves a program of spiritual and academic training. In the case of priestly formation, the typical location concerned is the seminary either operated by a Diocese for the purposes of training Diocesan or Secular clergy or operated by a religious order for the purpose of preparing its members for priestly ordination.

See also 
 Acculturation
 Disciple (Christianity)
 Indoctrination
 Moral development
 Onboarding
 Professional identification
 Socialization
 Spiritual development

Notes

Catholic education